Barrhead South was once one of four railway stations in Barrhead, Renfrewshire (now East Renfrewshire), Scotland.

History 
The station was originally part of the Paisley and Barrhead District Railway. The line was opened in 1897 and used for freight until the 1960s but none of the stations including this one opened for passenger travel.

Situated in the hills south of Barrhead, it was the only side platform station on the Paisley and Barrhead District Railway. It is clear from the wagons in the photograph that some railway activity took place in the area.

Recently, with housing development opening up nearby, the local council have confirmed they will be opening a station at a similar location to serve both new developments at Barrhead South and also at the Dams to Darnley Park.

References

Notes

Sources 
 
 

Disused railway stations in East Renfrewshire
Unbuilt railway stations in the United Kingdom
Barrhead